Group A of the 2003 Fed Cup Americas Zone Group I was one of two pools in the Americas Zone Group I of the 2003 Fed Cup. Four teams competed in a round robin competition, with the top teams coming first and second advancing to the play-offs, and the bottom team being relegated down to 2003 Group II.

Canada vs. Bahamas

Mexico vs. Uruguay

Canada vs. Uruguay

Mexico vs. Bahamas

Canada vs. Mexico

Uruguay vs. Bahamas

  failed to win any ties in the pool, and thus was relegated to Group II in 2004. However, they did not partake next year.

See also
Fed Cup structure

References

External links
 Fed Cup website

2003 Fed Cup Americas Zone